Alan C. Boothe (born November 14, 1945) is an American politician. He has been a member of the Alabama House of Representatives from the 89th District 1998. He is a member of the Republican Party.

References

Living people
Republican Party members of the Alabama House of Representatives
1945 births
People from Covington County, Alabama
21st-century American politicians